The 2012 season was Gyeongnam FC's seventh season in the K-League in South Korea. Gyeongnam FC will be competing in K-League and Korean FA Cup.

Current squad

Out on loan

Transfer

In

 

Notes
§ Gyeongnam decided against signing the player due to an injury.

Out

Coaching staff

Match results

K-League
All times are Korea Standard Time (KST) – UTC+9

League table

Results summary

Results by round

Korean FA Cup

Squad statistics

Appearances
Statistics accurate as of match played 27 June 2012

Goals and assists

Discipline

References

South Korean football clubs 2012 season
2012